The 1932–33 international cricket season was from September 1932 to April 1933.

Season overview

December

England in Australia

Ceylon in India

March

England in New Zealand

References

International cricket competitions by season
1932 in cricket
1933 in cricket